Pierre de Camboust, duc de Coislin (1664–1710) was a duke and peer of France, succeeding his father. He was admitted to the Académie française in his father's seat on 11 December 1702 by the abbé de Dangeau.

External links
 Biography on the Académie française site

1664 births
1710 deaths
 2
Members of the Académie Française
Pierre
18th-century peers of France